Djursholm Castle (Djursholms slott) is a castle in Sweden.

Djursholm is located in  Danderyd Municipality, within  Stockholm urban area.  The castle includes building components from the late Middle Ages.  It was the main building on the estate Djursholm, which was owned by the House of Banér from 1508 to 1813.  Nils Eskilsson (Banér), who was lord of Djursholm 1508 to 1520, built a new palace at the place where Djursholm Castle remains.

Djursholm Castle was the residence of both Privy Councillour Gustaf Banér and his son, Field Marshal Johan Banér. Svante Gustavsson Banér gave the castle its present appearance in the 17th century. By the mid 17th century the castle was its present size. The main hall was fitted at this time, with plaster ceilings, stairs castle was of limestone and oak, and walls hung with art wallpaper full of gilt leather (leather wallpaper) and other materials.

In 1891,  Djursholms secondary school (Djursholms samskola) was started in the building. Until 1910,  Djursholms secondary school operated on the premises.  The first inspector of Djursholms samskolas was author Viktor Rydberg.   Among the earliest teachers were Erik Axel Karlfeldt and Alice Tegner. Writer Elsa Beskow was an art teacher and her husband, theologian Natanael Beskow served as the headmaster of the school from 1897 to 1909.<ref>{{cite web |url=http://www.kirjasto.sci.fi/beskow.htm |title=Elsa Beskow (1874-1953) |website=Books and Writers (kirjasto.sci.fi) |first=Petri |last=Liukkonen |publisher=Kuusankoski Public Library |location=Finland |archiveurl=https://web.archive.org/web/20100727173040/http://www.kirjasto.sci.fi/beskow.htm |archivedate=27 July 2010 |url-status=dead }}</ref>

In the 1890s, the castle was restored in neo-Baroque style. Facade design was simplified by a new restoration from 1959 to 1961. A new entrance with modern suitability to the castle was built on the north side in 2003.  Today it serves as the community center (kommunhus) in Danderyd Municipality.

See also
List of castles in Sweden

References

Other sources
Renqvist, K.E.  Djursholm – vår hembygd'' (1961)

Buildings and structures in Stockholm
Castles in Stockholm County